Bedtime Story is a 1938 British comedy drama film directed by Donovan Pedelty and starring Jack Livesey, Lesley Wareing and Eliot Makeham. It was made as a quota quickie at Cricklewood Studios.

Cast
 Jack Livesey as Sir John Shale  
 Lesley Wareing as Judy  
 Eliot Makeham as Uncle Toby  
 Dorothy Dewhurst as Lady Blundell 
 Margery Morris as Isabel  
 Michel Bazalgette as Prince  
 Jonathan Field as Butler

References

Bibliography
 Chibnall, Steve. Quota Quickies: The Birth of the British 'B' Film. British Film Institute, 2007.
 Low, Rachael. Filmmaking in 1930s Britain. George Allen & Unwin, 1985.
 Wood, Linda. British Films, 1927-1939. British Film Institute, 1986.

External links

1938 films
British comedy-drama films
1938 comedy-drama films
Films directed by Donovan Pedelty
Quota quickies
Films shot at Cricklewood Studios
British black-and-white films
1930s English-language films
1930s British films